Nelson Lee is a fictional detective who featured in the Amalgamated Press papers over a 40-year run.  Created in 1894 by Maxwell Scott (the pseudonym of Dr. John Staniforth 1863-1927) he appeared in various publications including The Halfpenny Marvel, Pluck, The Boys' Friend, Boy’s Realm, The Boys' Herald and the Union Jack In 1915 he was given his own story-paper series, The Nelson Lee Library, which ran until 1933. 

In all Lee appeared in over 2500 tales set in every corner of the globe, making him one of the most published fictional detectives of all time.

Publication history

The 1890s: The solo years

Nelson Lee made his debut in A Dead Man’s Secret in The Halfpenny Marvel #46, on 19 September 1894. The world would meet him at the open of Chapter 2:

Nelson Lee, the famous detective, sat in his room in Gray’s Inn Road, dealing with his morning’s correspondence. So great was the demand for his advice and help that nine-tenths of his replies were to the effect that “Mr. Lee regrets that, owing to the number of cases he already has on hand, he is unable to deal with Mr. So-and-so’s case.” He had already replied in this strain to an earl whose family jewels had been stolen, a banker whose clerk had absconded, and a well-known member of the Jockey Club whose favourite race-horse had been poisoned, when he was interrupted by the entrance of his landlady, who handed him a card...

Lee was an immediate success and made his second appearance in Nelson Lee, Detective six issues later. He made his third appearance in The Adventures of Nelson Lee, in Union Jack Library #35, in December 1894 then made a final appearance in The Halfpenny Marvel in The Jewel Thief in issue #74. From May 1895 he began appearing in Pluck featuring in 18 tales over the next three years. That summer he also appeared in The Mystery of the Malton Moors published in the Comic Home Journal. In the 1895 Christmas issue of Pluck he starred alongside detectives Sexton Blake and Gideon Barr. The tale, Christmas Clues, established Lee and Blake as friends. The two would team up repeatedly over the next 40 years. During this period Lee worked alone for the most part, accepting cases from his office on Gray’s Inn Road. Tales from this era include:

The 1900s: The Great Serials

Towards the end of the 19th century Staniforth had a falling out with his editor and switched to publishing in other story papers. The era of the great Nelson Lee serials began with Birds of Prey a 20-part serial that ran in The Boys' Friend from July 27 to December 7, 1901. It was followed by The Silver Dwarf (Dec 7th 1901 to March 15, 1902) and The Missing Heir (March 29-August 9, 1902). Staniforth listed these as his favourite Nelson Lee tales.

Some of the popular Nelson Lee serials from this era include:

The boy-detective: The creation of a new sub-genre

In 1903 Nelson Lee's life changed forever. In Nelson Lee's Pupil he acquired an assistant: Richard Hamilton, better known as "Nipper". Nipper was a street urchin who made his first appearance in A Dead Man’s Secret ten years earlier. This retelling of their encounter ran from issues #2-26 in Boys' Herald and was subsequntly republished in The Boys' Friend Library in 1907. The two would be inseparable for the next 30 years.

Following in Lee's footsteps, Sexton Blake was given a boy assistant, Tinker, the following year, in Cunning against Skill, a tale penned by William Murray Graydon in 1904. Tinker and Nipper were influential in the subsequent creation of boy-detectives in the British story papers with subsequent authors following the pattern that they established: "uncultured but extraordinarily sharp street urchins, rescued from poverty and obscurity by a famous London private detective."

A few of Nipper's more prominet cases include:

The Boys' Friend Library
Many of Scott's Nelson Lee serials were abridged and republished as complete tales in the Boys' Friend Friend Library. 

Written by Maxwell Scott

Written by Edwy Searles Brooks

The Nelson Lee Library: 1915–1933 

Lee featured in his own long-running magazine, The Nelson Lee Library, from 1915 to 1933 which was published in four "series". The first issue of The Nelson Lee Library was published on 12 June 1915, entitled "The Mystery of Limehouse Reach" and written by Sexton Blake writer A. C. Murray. Many other popular Blake writers would pen Lee tales including William Murray Graydon, William J. Bayfield, George Hamilton Teed, Norman Goddard, and Edwy Searles Brooks.

Series 1 ran from 12 June 1915 until 24 April 1926, a total of 568 issues.
 
Series 2 ran from 1 May 1926 until 18 January 1930, a total of 194 issues.

Series 3 ran from 25 January 1930 until 18 February 1933, a total of 161 issues.

Series 4 ran from 25 February 1933 until 12 August 1933. The Nelson Lee Library then merged with the Gem.

A few issues of note: Maxwell Scott wrote just four adventures for the paper that bore his greatest creation's name, A Miscarriage of Justice (1915), The Convict's Dilemma (1915), In Borrowed Plumes (1915), and  When Rogues Fall Out (1916). The Spendthrift was George Hamilton Teed's first Nelson Lee tale. It was followed by Twenty Fathoms Deep Edwy Searles Brooks debut Lee tale. Teed following on the wild success of his Sexton Blake creation Yvonne Cartier, gave Nelson Lee his first female foe: The Black Wolf, a cross-dressing martial arts aristocrat. She would match wits with Lee and Nipper in various locations around the world. 
Not to be outdone, Brooks introduced Eileen Dare the female detective in Nelson Lee's Lady Assistant (1916). She appeared with Lee in 14 adventures. Brooks was instrumental in launching the second phase of Lee's career. In "Nipper at St. Frank's," (Nelson Lee Library #112, 28 July 1917,) Lee and Nipper while fleeing from a Chinese Triad hide out at St. Frank's, a "venerable public school" in the Bellton area of Sussex. When the case at last was solved, Lee joined the faculty as headmaster and Nipper enrolled as a student. The two remained there for the next sixteen years solving mysteries and having advanetures around the world, often with friends and Nipper's classmates.

Series 1: The Pre-Friardale Cases

Each issue contained a complete detective story.

Other Nelson Lee tales in the Nelson Lee Library

The Union Jack: 1916-1920

In all these tales, Nelson Lee and Nipper team up with Sexton Blake and Tinker.

The Sexton Blake Library: 1919-1921

In all these two tales, Nelson Lee and Nipper team up with Sexton Blake and Tinker.

The Detective Library: 1919-1921
The stories were predominantly written by Scott and Edwy Searles Brooks.

The Prairie Library: 1920
The stories were written by George Hamilton Teed.

The Nuggett Library: 1921

These tales were predominantly written by Andrew Murray. Many of these feature Sexton Blake foes and may be rewrites of Blake tales.

Lee's associates
In the early years of his career Lee worked intermittently with the French detective Jean Moreau. Later in the first years of the Nelson Lee Library he worked with 'girl detective' Eileen Dare. He had a bloodhound named Rajah, and later another named Wolf.

Lord Dorrimore or Dorrie, a somewhat eccentric millionaire, was one of the most popular characters to appear in the Nelson Lee Library. He often travelled with Umlosi, a mighty African warrior. The two made their first appearance in The Ivory Seekers and reappeared throughout Lee's tenure at St. Franks.

Lee collaborated with Sexton Blake on a number of occasions. The two worked together on The Winged Terror, penned by Maxwell Scott, a tale that ran in issues #329-336 of Boys' Herald in 1909. Later other authors paired the two in the pages of the Union Jack. In Double Harness, (Union Jack #683) written by Robert Murray Graydon saw the two working against each other to solve a case, while Waldo the Wonder Man, (Union Jack #794,) saw them team up to capture one of Blake's most beloved foes.

Lee's enemies

Nelson Lee had a fine rogues gallery of supervillains. Some of the most famous included:

Jim the Penman (created by Edwy Searles Brooks), was the nickname of Douglas James Sutcliffe, a solicitor turned forger and a master of disguise. One never knew where he was going to turn up next and his skill with the pen was only equalled by his skill at disguise, his audacity and brilliant sang froid, his coolness in emergency and his never-ceasing efforts to pull off some spectacular coup.

Professor Cyrus Zingrave (created by Edwy Searles Brooks), the Monster of Moat Hollow, a Napoleon of Crime.

The Black Wolf (created by George Hamilton Teed) Lee's greatest female opponent.

Dr. Mortimer Crane (created by George Hamilton Teed) a brain and nerve specialist whose talents had been diverted to wrong doing. He was a master of disguise and one of Lee's most sinister and cunning opponents.

He fought criminal organisations like the League of the Green Triangle, the Circle of Terror and the Fu Chang Tong and also matched wits against legendary Sexton Blake foes Zenith the Albino (created by Anthony Skene), Dr. Huxton Rymer (created by George Hamilton Teed), and deadly duo Count Ivor Carlac and Professor Francis Kew created by Andrew Murray.

Howard Baker collections 
 The Barring-Out at St. Frank's! by Edwy Searles Brooks
 Expelled Incorporating The Secret Societies of St. Frank's & The 'Death' of Walter Church by Edwy Searles Brooks
 The Haunted School Incorporating the entire Ezra Quirke series by Edwy Searles Brooks

New collections 
 Sexton Blake: The Early Years (2020) features the first 5 Nelson Lee cases by Maxwell Scott, includes Christmas Clues the first Nelson Lee/Sexton Blake co-appearance. 
 Sexton Blake: Friends and Allies (2020) features In Double Harness by Robert Murray Graydon
 Sexton Blake & Nelson Lee (2021) by Edwy Searles Brooks
 Sexton Blake: The Claire Delisle Files (2022) features The Valley of Fear by Francis Addington Symonds
 Nelson Lee: The Black Wolf Files (2020) by George Hamilton Teed
 Nelson Lee: The Scott Files (2021) by Maxwell Scott. Includes Birds of Prey, The Silver Dwarf, and The Missing Heir.

References

Further reading
 Turner, ES (1948) Boys Will be Boys History of British boys' weeklies from Victorian times up to the 1950s.
 Andrew, Lucy (2017) The Boy Detective in Early British Children's Literature. Palgrave. page 96
 Watt & Green (2017) The Alternative Sherlock Holmes: Pastiches, Parodies and Copies

External links
 The Nelson Lee Library at the Friardale Website
 Nelson Lee and St. Frank's School
 Nelson Lee at the Encyclopedia of Pulp Heroes
 Nelson Lee stories by Edwy Searles Brooks
 Nelson Lee Bibliography at The FictionMags Index
 Issues of The Nelson Lee Library at ComicBooksPlus

Literary characters introduced in 1894
Characters in pulp fiction
Fictional gentleman detectives